Kapušianske Kľačany is a village and municipality in Michalovce District in the Kosice Region of eastern Slovakia.
It was created in 1943 by merging the villages Kľačiany, Močiar and Ňarád, all first recorded in 1315. The current name Kapušianske Kľačany originated in 1948.

Etymology
Slovak Kľačane, see Kľačany for the details. The theory is supported also by the local name Močiar ("swamp).

History
In historical records the village was first mentioned in 1315.

Geography
The village lies at an altitude of 106 metres and covers an area of  (2020-06-30/-07-01).

Population 
It has a population of 959 people (2020-12-31).

Ethnicity
The population is 75% Magyar, 18% Romani and 7% Slovak in ethnicity.

Government

The village relies on the services of Veľké Kapušany

Culture
The village has a public library and a food store.

Sports
The village has a football pitch.

Transport
The nearest railway station is four kilometres away at Veľké Kapušany.

Genealogical resources

The records for genealogical research are available at the state archive "Statny Archiv in Kosice, Presov, Slovakia":
 Roman Catholic church records (births/marriages/deaths): 1831 – 1911 (parish B)
 Greek Catholic church records (births/marriages/deaths): 1813 – 1875 (parish B)
 Reformated church records (births/marriages/deaths): 1762 – 1852 (parish A)

See also
 List of municipalities and towns in Slovakia

References

External links
https://web.archive.org/web/20070513023228/http://www.statistics.sk/mosmis/eng/run.html
Surnames of living people in Kapusianske Klacany

Villages and municipalities in Michalovce District